The Rose Without a Thorn is a 1933 historical play by the British writer Clifford Bax. It portrays the courtship and marriage of Henry VIII and his fifth wife Catherine Howard.

It ran in the West End for 128 performances, debuting at the Duke of York's Theatre before transferring to the Vaudeville Theatre. The cast was headed by Frank Vosper as Henry VIII and also included Joan Maude, Alastair Sim, Lawrence Hanray and Fabia Drake.

In 1947 it was adapted by the BBC into a television film of the same title starring Arthur Young and Victoria Hopper as Henry and Catherine.

References

Bibliography
 Wearing, J.P. The London Stage 1930-1939: A Calendar of Productions, Performers, and Personnel.  Rowman & Littlefield, 2014.

1933 plays
Plays by Clifford Bax
West End plays
Plays set in England
Plays set in the 16th century
Plays about British royalty
Cultural depictions of Henry VIII